Microsania is a genus of flat-footed flies in the family Platypezidae.

Species
M. albani Chandler, 1994
M. alticola Collart, 1955
M. arthuri Chandler, 1994
M. australis Collart, 1938
M. boycei Chandler, 1994
M. capnophila Shatalkin, 1985
M. collarti Chandler, 2001
M. fijiensis Sinclair & Chandler, 2007
M. fumida Shatalkin, 1985
M. ghesquierei Collart, 1936
M. hebridensis Chandler, 1994
M. imperfecta (Loew, 1866)
M. lanka Chandler, 1994
M. meridionalis Collart, 1960
M. nigralula Chandler, 1994
M. occidentalis Malloch, 1935
M. pallipes (Meigen, 1830)
M. pectipennis (Meigen, 1830)
M. straeleni Collart, 1954
M. tonnoiri Collart, 1934
M. unicornuta Chandler, 1994
M. vrydaghi Collart, 1954

References

Platypezidae
Platypezoidea genera